The Roman Catholic Diocese of Yongjia/Yungkia/Wenzhou is a diocese located in the city of Yongjia in the Ecclesiastical province of Hangzhou in China.

History
 March 3, 1949: Established as Diocese of Yongjia 永嘉 from Diocese of Ningbo 寧波

Leadership
 Bishops of Yongjia 永嘉 (Roman Rite)
 Bishop Peter Shao Zhumin (2016 - )
 Bishop Vincent Zhu Wei-Fang (2010 - 2016)
 Bishop James Lin Xili (1992 - 2007)
 Fr. Paul Su Bo-lu (Su Pai-lu) (Apostolic Administrator June 15, 1951 – 1980)
 Bishop André-Jean-François Defebvre, C.M. (Apostolic Administrator 1950–1951)

References

 GCatholic.org
 Catholic Hierarchy

Roman Catholic dioceses in China
Christian organizations established in 1949
Roman Catholic dioceses and prelatures established in the 20th century
1949 establishments in China
Christianity in Zhejiang
Wenzhou